The Missouri and Northern Arkansas Railroad, LLC  is a Class II Regional Railroad in the U.S. states of Missouri, Kansas, and Arkansas. The company is headquartered in Carthage, Missouri. It is not to be confused with the Missouri and North Arkansas Railroad which connected Joplin, Missouri with Helena, Arkansas from 1906 to 1946.

MNA is owned by Genesee & Wyoming, a shortline railroad holding company, having been purchased in 2013 with the acquisition of RailAmerica who bought the MNA back in 2000.

Operations 

Its mainline extends  from Pleasant Hill, Missouri through Carthage, Missouri to Daiz, Arkansas. On the mainline, MNA interchanges with the Union Pacific Railroad at Pleasant Hill, MO and Daiz, AR, and with the BNSF Railway at Aurora, Missouri. The line no longer interchanges with the BNSF Railway at Lamar, Missouri or Carthage, Missouri.

MNA operates a  secondary line from just east of Fort Scott, Kansas east to Clinton, Missouri. This secondary line interchanges with MNA's Pleasant Hill–Diaz mainline in Nevada, Missouri. It formerly interchanged with BNSF at Fort Scott, Kansas in 1998. Along this track, MNA serves an ADM Bio-Diesel Plant located to the west of Deerfield, Missouri. MNA uses its track between Nevada, MO and Clinton, MO to serve a few customers in Clinton and the Montrose Generating Station, an Evergy coal-fired power plant near La Due, Missouri.

MNA also operates a  branch line from Carthage, MO to Joplin, MO that interchanges with MNA's Pleasant Hill–Daiz mainline At Carthage, with the Kansas City Southern Railway in Joplin, and with the BNSF in Joplin. A  MNA branch line that branches off of the Carthage–Joplin branch line originates from an interchange in Webb City, Missouri and terminates in Atlas, Missouri.

MNA also operates several miles of industrial trackage in the city of Springfield; this segment is disconnected from the rest of the MNA system and traffic is hauled via BNSF to and from the Aurora interchange. Here MNA interchanges with BNSF at Springfield, MO.

Other operated segments are leased from the Union Pacific and BNSF Railroads. MNA has rail yards in Carthage, MO, Nevada, MO, Joplin, MO, Aurora, MO, Cotter, AR, and Batesville, AR.

MNA traffic generally consists of coal, grain, frozen foods, minerals, steel, chemicals, and asphalt.  MNA operates unit coal trains to a major power plant in Newark, AR. In 2008, the railroad hauled around 111,000 carloads.

The Branson Scenic Railway, which runs on track owned by the MNA, operates the "Ozark Zephyr" from Branson, Missouri.  Trains operate mostly south into Arkansas but occasionally north to Galena, Missouri, depending on MNA traffic and/or track work. The restored 1906 depot it operates out of is across from Branson Landing in historic downtown Branson.

From 1997 until 2000, the White River Scenic Railroad had operated an excursion train from Flippin, Arkansas to Calico Rock, Arkansas.

Unit grain trains sometimes run from the interchange at Pleasant Hill, MO to the Tyson Foods feed mill at Bergman, AR and back empty.

MNA also runs Union Pacific unit coal trains to unload at the Independence Power Plant in Newark, AR, then hands them back to UP in Kansas City, MO.

History 
The MNA mainline between Kansas City and Newport originated as the former Missouri Pacific Railroad's White River Line, which was initially chartered in 1883 and was part of the MoPac's mainline between Kansas City and Memphis, Tennessee. The MNA began operations on December 13, 1992, and purchased the  segment from Bergman, Arkansas to Guion, Arkansas from MoPac. The secondary line from Fort Scott, Kansas through Nevada, Missouri to Clinton, Missouri was once part of a former Missouri–Kansas–Texas Railroad mainline from Parsons, Kansas through Sedalia, Missouri to St. Louis, Missouri. The disused track between Nevada, Missouri and Fort Scott, Kansas, was an important link between the MNA and BNSF's Fort Scott subdivision; In 1998 it was completely abandoned west of 240th Street just east of Fort Scott.

References

External links

MNA page on GWRR website
Union Pacific Website with MNA Details
BNSF Railway Website with MNA Details

Arkansas railroads
Kansas railroads
Missouri railroads
Regional railroads in the United States
RailAmerica
Spin-offs of the Union Pacific Railroad